The Everglades Protection Area is a protected area of the Florida Everglades as defined by the Everglades Forever Act, and includes Water Conservation Area 1 (a.k.a.  the Arthur R. Marshall Loxahatchee National Wildlife Refuge), Water Conservation Area 2, made up of WCA-2a and WCA-2b, Water Conservation Area 3, made up of WCA-3a and WCA-3b, and the Everglades National Park.

See also
 Everglades
 Everglades National Park

References

Everglades
Everglades National Park